Jean Mercanton (20 May 1920 – 4 November 1947) was a French film actor. Mercanton began his career as a child actor, making his film debut in the year of his birth.

Selected filmography
 Miarka (1920)
 The Two Boys (1924)
 Cinders (1926)
 The Maid at the Palace (1927)
 Croquette (1927)
 The Passenger (1928)
 Venus (1929)
 The Mystery of the Villa Rose (1930)
 Princess, At Your Orders! (1931)
 Narcotics (1932)
 Monsieur Albert (1932)
 He Is Charming (1932)
 Captain Benoit (1938)
 The Little Thing (1938)
 Three from St Cyr (1939)
 The Phantom Carriage (1939)
 Destitute Mary (1945)
 Distress (1946)
 Son of France (1946)

References

Bibliography
  Goble, Alan. The Complete Index to Literary Sources in Film. Walter de Gruyter, 1999.

External links

1920 births
1947 deaths
French male film actors
French male silent film actors
20th-century French male actors
Male actors from Marseille